Roger Powell may refer to:

Roger Powell (badminton), retired male badminton player from England
Roger Powell (basketball) (born 1983), American professional basketball player
Roger Powell (bookbinder) (1896–1990), English bookbinder
Roger Powell (musician) (born 1949), American musician known for being the former keyboardist of Utopia
Roger Powell (scientist) (born 1949), emeritus professor of geology at the University of Melbourne
Roger Powell (general) (born 1949), retired officer of the Australian Army
Roger Powell, British drummer, studio musician and member of The Action, Mighty Baby and the Albion Country Band